Texas's 6th congressional district of the United States House of Representatives is in an area that includes Ellis and Navarro counties to the south and southeast of the Dallas/Fort Worth area plus the southeast corner of Tarrant County.  As of the 2010 census, the 6th district represented 698,498 people. The district is currently represented by Republican Jake Ellzey.

The district was represented by Joe Barton from 1985 until 2019.  Other notable representatives include Olin "Tiger" Teague and Phil Gramm. The latter served as a Democrat, then notably resigned and ran as a Republican to win the ensuing special election.

A special election to fill the seat was held on May 1, 2021, with the winner being determined in a July 27 runoff after no candidate received a majority of the vote. In the runoff, Republican state representative Jake Ellzey defeated fellow Republican Susan Wright (the widow of Ron Wright and the endorsee of former President Donald Trump), winning the seat.

Election results from presidential races

List of members representing the district

Election results 

This special election took place after Wright died from health complications related to COVID-19 on February 7, 2021.

Historical district boundaries

Early in the district's history it stretched from the southern Dallas-Fort Worth suburbs all the way to Houston's northern suburbs.  As Houston and DFW grew, the district shrank gradually northward, reaching its current boundaries today.

2012 redistricting
The 2012 redistricting process removed all of Trinity, Houston, Leon, Freestone, and Limestone counties from the district, while making the district more compact in southeastern Tarrant County.

See also
List of United States congressional districts

References

 Congressional Biographical Directory of the United States 1774–present

06